The Harry T. Jones House is a historic house in Seward, Nebraska. It was built in 1889 for Harry T. Jones, the president of the Jones National Bank. It was designed in the Queen Anne style by George A. Berlinghof. According to historian Joni Gilkerson of the Nebraska State Historical Society, "The main wrap-a-round porch displays classical support colonettes grouped together in units of two or three, a balustrade, spindlework, pediments with decorated tympanums, and a distinctive corner turret with a conical roof of patterned shingles. The second story wrap-a-round porch exhibits similar detailing, including ornamental latticework." The house has been listed on the National Register of Historic Places since November 28, 1990.

References

National Register of Historic Places in Seward County, Nebraska
Queen Anne architecture in Nebraska
Houses completed in 1889